Vadal may refer to :

 Vadal, Gujarat, a village and petty former princely state on Saurashtra peninsula in Gujarat, India
 Vadal Alexander (born 1994), American NFL offensive guard
 Vadal Peterson (1892–1976), American basketball coach

See also 
 Nedre Vådal, near Røra, Nord-Trøndelag county, Norway